Tuanku Muhriz ibni Almarhum Tuanku Munawir (born 14 January 1948) is the eleventh Yang di-Pertuan Besar (Grand Ruler) of Negeri Sembilan, Malaysia.

Early life
Tunku Muhriz is the only son out of six children of the late Tuanku Munawir ibni Almarhum Tuanku Abdul Rahman, the Yang di-Pertuan Besar of Negeri Sembilan from 1960 to 1967, and of his consort, Tunku Ampuan Durah binti Almarhum Tunku Besar Burhanuddin.

Born in 1948, Tunku Muhriz received his primary & secondary education at the SMK Tuanku Muhammad (Tuanku Muhammad School) Kuala Pilah and Tunku Besar Schools in Tampin, the King George V School in Seremban, Negeri Sembilan and later at the Aldenham School in the United Kingdom.

Tunku Muhriz obtained a degree in law (LLB) from the University College of Wales at Aberystwyth (later known as the University of Wales, Aberystwyth).

He began his career in an international bank in Malaysia and became a director and shareholder of a company licensed as brokers in interbank foreign exchange and in the currency deposits market(1973–1986). He was the chairman and shareholder of a Malaysian joint venture with a worldwide advertising agency (1981–1992), chairman and director of a joint venture company involved in the manufacturing of building products(1995–1998) and a director and shareholder of a company engaged in electrical engineering and construction (1995 to present). He has been on the board of directors of Bangkok Bank since 2006.

Tunku Besar
Tuanku Muhriz was made Tunku Besar, or heir presumptive in 1960. However, he was bypassed by the Council of Undangs to become Yang di-Pertuan Besar when his father died in 1967 for his uncle, Tuanku Jaafar. Tuanku Jaafar was elected by the Undangs as the 10th Yang di-Pertuan Besar of Negeri Sembilan.

The Negeri Sembilan Constitution states that the Undangs should elect a suitable and competent ruler first from the sons of the deceased ruler, followed in order from the brothers, then paternal uncles, grandsons, brothers' sons, and paternal uncles' sons of the deceased ruler.

Tuanku Muhriz was first in the order of succession before the death of Tuanku Munawir, followed by Tunku Jaafar and Tunku Abdullah. When Tuanku Munawir died, Tuanku Muhriz was not chosen. Instead the council chose his half-uncle Tuanku Jaafar ibni Almarhum Tuanku Abdul Rahman, a diplomat. It has been suggested that the then Prime Minister of Malaysia, Tunku Abdul Rahman, influenced the Undangs not to choose Tuanku Muhriz on account of his youth (he was then only nineteen).

Yang di-Pertuan Besar
On 29 December 2008, The Council of Undang proclaimed him as the 11th Yang di-Pertuan Besar of Negeri Sembilan succeeding Almarhum Tuanku Jaafar ibni Almarhum Tuanku Abdul Rahman who had died on 27 December 2008. It has been learnt that many prominent Malaysians had backed Tuanku Muhriz to succeed as the Ruler of Negeri Sembilan in view of his modest and dignified personality and by his having a successful corporate career. He was also the rightful heir, by tradition, to the throne on the death of his father.  

Due to a lifelong habit of keeping a low profile, Tuanku Muhriz was largely unknown outside royal circles in Negeri Sembilan. However, Tuanku Muhriz was hardly the underdog in the intense negotiations that was played out for the position of Yang di-Pertuan Besar of Negri Sembilan. During the closed discussions to elect the successor to the late Tuanku Jaafar, at least two, if not all four of the Undangs strongly championed his candidacy. They refused to budge when it was suggested that they consider Tunku Naquiyuddin, Tuanku Jaafar's eldest son, instead as the next Ruler of Negeri Sembilan.

Tuanku Muhriz has throughout his life established and maintained strong ties with the Undangs, the general nobility, the lesser royalty and people of Negeri Sembilan, and more so since moving back to the state a few years ago. He also has powerful backers within the political establishment in the state, with the former Menteri Besar Tan Sri Mohd Isa Abdul Samad among his supporters.

There has been a quiet campaign by his loyal supporters at state and federal level to portray him as a well-spoken and well-educated man; someone who had the great strength of character to put aside the disappointment of not being appointed Ruler of the state in 1967: and who continues to lead a dignified and respectable life.

His supporters said that in contrast to members of Tuanku Jaafar's family, Tuanku Muhriz shuns publicity and though he can be very progressive in his outlook, he seems more rooted in traditional ways. Tuanku Jaafar's family are said to be completely devastated with the decision of the Undangs to select Tuanku Muhriz over Tunku Naquiyuddin. They too had several powerful politicians in their camp but the Undangs were not to be swayed.

Personal life
Tunku Muhriz is married to Terengganu princess Tuanku Aishah Rohani and the royal couple have three sons: Tunku Ali Redhauddin, Tunku Zain Al-'Abidin and Tunku Alif Hussein.

Honours 

He was awarded:

Honours of Negeri Sembilan 
  : 
  Royal Family Order of Negeri Sembilan Grand Master (since 29 December 2008) and Member (25 February 2009)
  Grand Master of the Order of Negeri Sembilan (since 29 December 2008)
  Grand Master and Recipient of the Royal Family Order of Yam Tuan Radin Sunnah (since 29 December 2008)
  Grand Master of the Order of Loyalty to Negeri Sembilan (since 29 December 2008)
  Founding Grand Master of the Order of Loyalty to Tuanku Muhriz (Negeri Sembilan) (since 14 January 2010)
  Founding Grand Master of the Order of Loyal Service to Negeri Sembilan (since 14 January 2010)
  Grand Master of the Grand Order of Tuanku Ja’afar (Negeri Sembilan) (since 29 December 2008 )
  Founding Grand Master of the Distinguished Conduct Order (Negeri Sembilan) (since ?)
  Recipient of the Distinguished Conduct Medal (PPT)

Honours of Malaysia 
  :
  Recipient of the Order of the Crown of the Realm (DMN) 
  :
  First Class of the Royal Family Order of Johor (DK I) 
  : 
  Member of the Royal Family Order of Kedah (DK, 17 January 2010)
  :
  Recipient of the Royal Family Order or Star of Yunus (DK)
  : 
  Recipient of the Royal Family Order of Perak (DK, 5 March 2009)
  :
  Recipient of the Perlis Family Order of the Gallant Prince Syed Putra Jamalullail (DK)
  : 
  First Class of the Royal Family Order of Selangor (DK I, 11 December 2009)
  :
  Member first class of the Family Order of Terengganu (DK I)

Ancestry

References

Muhriz
1948 births
Living people
Muhriz
Muhriz
Malaysian Muslims
People educated at Aldenham School
Malaysian people of Minangkabau descent

First Classes of Royal Family Order of Selangor
First Classes of the Royal Family Order of Johor
Members of the Royal Family Order of Kedah
First Classes of the Family Order of Terengganu

21st-century Malaysian politicians
Recipients of the Order of the Crown of the Realm